GB 18030 is a Chinese government standard, described as Information Technology — Chinese coded character set and defines the required language and character support necessary for software in China. GB18030 is the registered Internet name for the official character set of the People's Republic of China (PRC) superseding GB2312. As a Unicode Transformation Format (i.e. an encoding of all Unicode code points), GB18030 supports both simplified and traditional Chinese characters. It is also compatible with legacy encodings including GB2312, CP936, and GBK 1.0.

In addition to the "GB18030 character encoding", this standard contains requirements about which scripts must be supported, font support, etc.

As of 2022, in terms of font implementations, "only the Simplified Chinese fonts of the Noto Sans CJK (Google), Source Han Mono (Adobe), and Source Han Sans (Adobe) typeface families are already compliant with GB 18030-2022 Implementation Level 2 [..] Microsoft YaHei (Microsoft), Noto Serif CJK (Google), PingFang (Apple), and Source Han Serif (Adobe)—at least the versions —require a small number of URO additions that are associated with Implementation Level 1 in order to become compliant with GB 18030-2022 Implementation Level 2."

History 

The GB18030 character set is formally called "Chinese National Standard GB 18030-2005: Information Technology—Chinese coded character set".  GB abbreviates Guójiā Biāozhǔn (国家标准), which means national standard in Chinese. The standard was published by the China Standard Press, Beijing, 8 November 2005.  Only a portion of the standard is mandatory. Since 1 May 2006, support for the mandatory subset is officially required for all software products sold in the PRC.

An older version of the standard, known as "Chinese National Standard GB 18030-2000: Information Technology—Chinese ideograms coded character set for information interchange—Extension for the basic set", was published on March 17, 2000.  The encoding scheme stays the same in the new version, and the only difference in GB-to-Unicode mapping is that GB 18030-2000 mapped the character  (ḿ) to a private use code point U+E7C7, and character  (without specifying any glyph) to U+1E3F (ḿ), whereas GB 18030-2005 swaps these two mapping assignments. More code points are now associated with characters due to update of Unicode, especially the appearance of CJK Unified Ideographs Extension B. Some characters used by ethnic minorities in China, such as Mongolian characters and Tibetan characters (GB 16959-1997 and GB/T 20542-2006), have been added as well, which accounts for the renaming of the standard.

Compared with its ancestors, GB 18030's mapping to Unicode has been modified for the 81 characters that were provisionally assigned a Unicode Private Use Area code point (U+E000–F8FF) in GBK 1.0 and that have later been encoded in Unicode. This is specified in Appendix E of GB 18030. There are 24 characters in GB 18030-2005 that are still mapped to Unicode PUA. 

In the GB 18030-2022 update, the requirements for characters to be mapped to PUA has been lifted completely and all characters should be mapped to their standard Unicode codepoints.

As a national standard 
The first version of GB 18030, designated GB 18030-2000 Information Technology—Chinese coded character set for information interchange — Extension for the basic set, consists of 1-byte and 2-byte encodings, together with 4-byte encoding for CJK Unified Ideographs Extension A matching those in Unicode 3.0. The corresponding Unicode code points of this subset, including provisional private assignments, lie entirely in the BMP. These parts are fully mandatory in GB 18030-2000. Most major computer companies had already standardized on some version of Unicode as the primary format for use in their binary formats and OS calls. However, they mostly had only supported code points in the BMP originally defined in Unicode 1.0, which supported only 65,536 codepoints and was often encoded in 16 bits as UCS-2. This standard is basically an extension based on GBK with additional characters in CJK Unified Ideographs Extension A.

The second version designated GB 18030-2005 Information Technology—Chinese coded character set has the same mandatory subset as GB 18030-2000 of 1-, 2- and 4-byte encodings. This version also includes the full CJK Unified Ideographs Extension B in the 4-byte encoding section which is outside the BMP as a suggestion support requirement. However, as the inclusion of CJK Unified Ideographs Extension B in a 4-byte region is required to be maintained during information processing, software can no longer get away with treating characters as 16-bit fixed width entities (UCS-2). Therefore, they must either process the data as a variable-width format (as with UTF-8 or UTF-16), which is the most common choice, or move to a larger fixed-width format (i.e. UTF-32). Microsoft made the change from UCS-2 to UTF-16 with Windows 2000. This version matches with Unicode 3.1, and also provided support for Hangul (Korean), Mongolian (including Manchu, Clear script, Sibe hergen, Galik), Tai Nuea, Tibetan, Uyghur/Kazakh/Kyrgyz and Yi.

The third and latest version, GB 18030-2022 Information Technology—Chinese coded character set, mandates the suggestion support part of CJK Unified Ideographs Extension B in GB 18030-2005, along with updates up to Unicode 11.0 including Kangxi Radicals and CJK Unified Ideographs Extension C, D, E and F. Additional languages are also recognized by GB 18030-2022 such as part of Arabic, Tai Le, New Tai Lue, Tai Tham, Lisu, and Miao. GB 18030-2022 also introduces three implementation levels, with the requirement of “all products using this standard should implements Implementation Level 1” that includes 66 new BMP characters in the 4-byte encoding region that were added between Unicode 3.1 and Unicode 11.0. Implementation Level 2 requires the support of Table of General Standard Chinese Characters, and Implementation Level 3 requires all other specified regions in the standard.

Mapping  
GB 18030 defines a one (ASCII), two (extended GBK), or four-byte (UTF) encoding.  The two-byte codes are defined in a lookup table, while the four-byte codes are defined sequentially (hence algorithmically) to fill otherwise unencoded parts in UCS.  GB 18030 inherits the bad aspects of GBK, most notably needing special code to safely find ASCII characters in a GB18030 sequence.

The one- and two-byte code points are essentially GBK with the euro sign, PUA mappings for unassigned/user-defined points, and vertical punctuations. The four byte scheme can be thought of as consisting of two units, each of two bytes.  Each unit has a similar format to a GBK two byte character but with a range of values for the second byte of 0x30–0x39 (the ASCII codes for decimal digits). The first byte has the range 0x81 to 0xFE, as before. This means that a string-search routine that is safe for GBK should also be reasonably safe for GB18030 (in much the same way that a basic byte-oriented search routine is reasonably safe for EUC).

This gives a total of 1,587,600 (126×10×126×10) possible 4 byte sequences, which is easily sufficient to cover Unicode's 1,112,064 (17×65536 − 2048 surrogates) assigned, reserved, and noncharacter code points.

Unfortunately, to further complicate matters there are no simple rules to translate between a 4 byte sequence and its corresponding code point. Instead, codes are allocated sequentially (with the first byte containing the most significant part and the last the least significant part) only to Unicode code points that are not mapped in any other manner. For example:

 U+00DE (Þ) → 81 30 89 37
 U+00DF (ß) → 81 30 89 38
 U+00E0 (à) → A8 A4
 U+00E1 (á) → A8 A2
 U+00E2 (â) → 81 30 89 39
 U+00E3 (ã) → 81 30 8A 30

An offset table is used in the WHATWG and W3C version of GB 18030 to efficiently translate code points. ICU and glibc use similar range definitions to avoid wasting space on large sequential blocks.

Support

Encoding 
The encoding is supported on all current Windows, i.e. since Windows Vista as code page 54936. Windows 2000 (and then XP too) can support the GB18030 encoding if GB18030 Support Package is installed. The open source PostgreSQL database supports GB18030 through its full support for UTF-8, i.e. by converting it to and from UTF-8. Similarly Microsoft SQL Server supports GB18030 by conversion to and from UTF-16.

More specifically, supporting the GB18030 encoding on Windows means that Code Page 54936 is supported by MultiByteToWideChar and WideCharToMultiByte.  Due to the backward compatibility of the mapping, many files in GB18030 can be actually opened successfully as the legacy Code Page 936, that is GBK, even if the Code Page 54936 is not supported.  However, that is only true if the file in question contains only GBK characters. Loading will fail or cause corrupted result if the file contains characters that do not exist in GBK (see § Technical details for examples).

GNU glibc's gconv, the character codec library used on most Linux distributions, supports GB 18030-2000 since 2.2, and GB 18030-2005 since 2.14; glibc notably includes non-PUA mappings for GB 18030-2005 in order to achieve round-trip conversion. GNU libiconv, an alternative iconv implementation frequently used on non-glibc UNIX-like environments like Cygwin, supports GB 18030 since version 1.4.

As of 2022, "supporting non-Chinese scripts continues to be optional" (presumably for display/font support only; and in China, since the encoding is a full UTF). The standard is known to support English/ASCII and the "following non-Chinese scripts are recognized by GB 18030-2022: Arabic, Tibetan, Mongolian, Tai Le, New Tai Lue, Tai Tham, Yi, Lisu, Hangul (Korean), and Miao."

Glyphs 
The GB18030 Support Package for Windows contains SimSun18030.ttc, a TrueType font collection file which combines two Chinese fonts, SimSun-18030 and NSimSun-18030. The SimSun 18030 font includes all the characters in Unicode 2.1 plus new characters found in the Unicode CJK Unified Ideographs Extension A block although, despite its name, it does not contain glyphs for all characters encoded by GB 18030, as all (about a million) Unicode code points up to U+10FFFF can be encoded as GB 18030. GB 18030 compliance certification only requires correct handling and recognition of glyphs in the mandatory (two-byte, and CJK Ext. A) Chinese part. Nevertheless, the requirement of PUA characters in the standard have hampered this implementation.

Other CJK font families like HAN NOM and Hanazono Mincho provide wider coverage for Unicode CJK Extension blocks than SimSun-18030 or even SimSun (Founder Extended), but they don't support all code points defined in Unicode 5.0.0 either.

See also 
 Guobiao code
 CJK characters
 Chinese character encoding
 Comparison of Unicode encodings

Notes

References

External links 
IANA Charset Registration for GB18030

Introduction to GB18030 including evolution from GB2312 and GBK (Sun/Internet Archive)
ICU data
GB18030: A mega-codepage (IBM DeveloperWorks)
Authoritative mapping table between GB18030-2000 and Unicode
ICU Converter Explorer: GB18030
Unicode charts
 Unicode CJK Unified Ideographs Extension A (PDF, 1.5 MB)
Unicode CJK Unified Ideographs Extension B (PDF, 13 MB)
GB18030 Support Package for Windows 2000/XP, including Chinese, Tibetan, Yi, Mongolian and Thai font by Microsoft (Internet Archive)
SIL's freeware fonts, editors and documentation

Character sets
18030
Encodings of Asian languages
Unicode Transformation Formats
Chinese-language computing